Firmus (died 273) was a usurper during the reign of Aurelian.

Firmus may also refer to:

 Firmus (4th-century usurper) (died 375)
 Firmus and Rusticus, 3rd century saints
 Firmus Energy, a Northern Ireland energy company
 Admiral Firmus Piett, a fictional character in Star Wars

See also